A list of films produced in Italy in 1927 (see 1927 in film):

See also
List of Italian films of 1926
List of Italian films of 1928

External links
 Italian films of 1927 at the Internet Movie Database

Italian
1927
Films